This Fool is an American comedy television series created by Chris Estrada, Pat Bishop, Matt Ingebretson, and Jake Weisman, and starring Estrada and Frankie Quiñones. It premiered on Hulu on August 12, 2022. In November 2022, the series was renewed for a second season. The show includes a comedic look at cholo culture and lifestyle.

Synopsis
Julio Lopez is 30 and still living with his mother and grandmother in his childhood bedroom. He works at Hugs Not Thugs, a gang rehabilitation center in Los Angeles that helps recently incarcerated people readjust to life outside of prison. His older cousin Luis is a former gang member who was recently released from prison after an eight-year stint, and is now in the Hugs Not Thugs program.

Cast
 Chris Estrada as Julio Lopez
 Frankie Quiñones as Luis
 Michael Imperioli as Minister Payne
 Michelle Ortiz as Maggie
 Laura Patalano as Esperanza
 Julia Vera as Maria
 Fabian Alomar as Fabian
 Sandra Marcela Hernandez as Ana

Episodes

Production
The series was created by Chris Estrada with producers Pat Bishop, Matt Ingebretson, and Jake Weisman. Bishop, Ingebretson and Weisman, who at the time were producing the Comedy Central series Corporate, approached Estrada about creating a show in 2018. Fred Armisen is an executive producer. On November 10, 2022, Hulu renewed the series for a second season.

Release
All 10 episodes of the series premiered on Hulu on August 12, 2022.

Reception 
The first season received generally positive reviews, with a 100% on Rotten Tomatoes. Frankie Quiñones was nominated for Best Supporting Performance in a New Scripted Series by the Independent Spirit Awards.

References

External links 
 
 

2020s American comedy television series
2022 American television series debuts
English-language television shows
Television shows set in Los Angeles
Television series by ABC Studios
Hulu original programming